Yang Xin (born 25 January 1994) is a Chinese footballer who currently plays for Jiangxi Liansheng in the China League One.

Club career
Yang Xin started to play organized football at the age of seven. He was scouted by Zhao Dayu in 2004 and moved to Guangzhou Yida football school. He then joined Chinese Super League side Guangzhou Evergrande in 2013 and was promoted to the club's first team in 2014, which made him the only player from Jiangxi in the 2014 Chinese Super League. Yang made his senior debut on 16 February 2014 against Guizhou Renhe in a 1–0 defeat in the 2014 Chinese FA Super Cup. Yang was demoted to the reserve squad in the 2016 season. On 20 January 2017, he received a ban of five months by the Chinese Football Association for age falsification which he changed his age from 25 January 1994 to 25 January 1995 when he was at Guangzhou Yida.

On 11 March 2018, Yang transferred to his hometown club Jiangxi Liansheng in the China League Two.

Career statistics

References

External links
 

1994 births
Living people
People from Jingdezhen
Chinese footballers
Footballers from Jiangxi
Guangzhou F.C. players
Jiangxi Beidamen F.C. players
China League Two players

Chinese Super League players
Association football midfielders